The 1917–18 Duquesne Dukes men's basketball team represents Duquesne University during the 1917–18 college men's basketball season. The head coach was Eugene McGuigan coaching the Dukes in his fourth year. The team finished the season with an overall record of 4–4.

Schedule 

|-

References 

Duquesne Dukes men's basketball seasons
Duquesne